Swoogle was a search engine for Semantic Web ontologies, documents, terms and data published on the Web.  Swoogle employed a system of crawlers to discover RDF documents and HTML documents with embedded RDF content.  Swoogle reasoned about these documents and their constituent parts (e.g., terms and triples) and recorded and indexed meaningful metadata about them in its database.

Swoogle provided services to human users through a browser interface and to software agents via RESTful web services. Several techniques were used to rank query results inspired by the PageRank algorithm developed at Google
but adapted to the semantics and use patterns found in semantic web documents.

Swoogle was developed at and was hosted by the University of Maryland, Baltimore County (UMBC) with funding from the US DARPA and National Science Foundation agencies. It was PhD thesis work of Li Ding advised by Professor Tim Finin.

See also 
 Ontology (computer science)
 DAML and DAML+OIL
 OWL
 Semantic Web

References 

Semantic Web
Internet search engines
Ontology (information science)